Matthew Jordan (born 18 January 1996) is an English professional golfer. He plays on the European Tour where has one win, the 2019 Italian Challenge Open Eneos Motor Oil.

Amateur career
Jordan had a successful amateur career. He won the St Andrews Links Trophy in 2017 and in 2018 he won the Lytham Trophy by 9 strokes. He represented Great Britain and Ireland in the 2017 Walker Cup, while in 2018 he played in the Bonallack Trophy, the European Amateur Team Championship, the St Andrews Trophy and the Eisenhower Trophy.

Professional career
Jordan turned professional in September 2018, after the Eisenhower Trophy. He finished in a tie for 7th place in the Turkish Airlines Challenge, the opening event of the 2019 Challenge Tour season. In May, Jordan led the Betfred British Masters after a first round of 63. He eventually finished in a tie for 15th place. At the end of June he won the Italian Challenge Open Eneos Motor Oil beating Lorenzo Scalise at the first playoff hole.

Amateur wins
2017 St Andrews Links Trophy
2018 Lytham Trophy

Source:

Professional wins (1)

Challenge Tour wins (1)

Challenge Tour playoff record (1–0)

Results in major championships

Team appearances
Amateur
European Amateur Team Championship (representing England): 2017, 2018
Walker Cup (representing Great Britain & Ireland): 2017
Bonallack Trophy (representing Europe): 2018
St Andrews Trophy (representing Great Britain and Ireland): 2018
Eisenhower Trophy (representing England): 2018

Source:

See also
2019 Challenge Tour graduates

References

External links

English male golfers
1996 births
Living people